Arthur Bailey (11 January 1911 – 2006) was an English footballer who played as an inside left for Chapel-en-le-Frith, Manchester North End, Oldham Athletic, and Stalybridge Celtic.

Career
Bailey played for Chapel-en-le-Frith, Manchester North End, Oldham Athletic (in two spells), and Stalybridge Celtic. During World War II he played as a guest for Wolverhampton Wanderers, Manchester United, Blackpool, Rochdale, the Royal Air Force, and Port Vale.

Career statistics
Source:

References

1911 births
2006 deaths
Footballers from Manchester
English footballers
Association football inside forwards
Manchester North End F.C. players
Oldham Athletic A.F.C. players
Stalybridge Celtic F.C. players
Wolverhampton Wanderers F.C. wartime guest players
Manchester United F.C. wartime guest players
Blackpool F.C. wartime guest players
Rochdale A.F.C. wartime guest players
Port Vale F.C. wartime guest players
Shrewsbury Town F.C. players
English Football League players
Royal Air Force personnel of World War II